Henry Sanford Walbridge (April 8, 1801 – January 27, 1869) was a U.S. Representative from New York and a cousin of Hiram Walbridge.

Born in Norwich, Connecticut, Walbridge attended school in Bennington, Vermont. He moved to Ithaca, New York in 1820. He studied law, was admitted to the bar and commenced practice in Ithaca. He served as clerk of the board of supervisors of Tompkins County in 1824. He served as president of the village council of Ithaca, Tompkins County, in 1829 and again in 1842. He was a member of the State assembly in 1846.

Walbridge was elected as a Whig to the Thirty-second Congress (March 4, 1851 – March 3, 1853). He declined to be a candidate for renomination in 1852.

He was Trustee of Ithaca Academy 1858–1868. He served as judge and surrogate of Tompkins County in 1859–1868. He moved to Leonia, New Jersey, in 1868 and practiced law in New York City.

Walbridge was killed in a railroad accident at the Bergen Tunnel near Hoboken, New Jersey on January 27, 1869. He was interred in Ithaca City Cemetery, Ithaca, New York.

Walbridge married three times; his daughter Alice Walbridge Gulick was a Christian missionary in Spain, Cuba, Philadelphia, and Hawaii.

References

People from Leonia, New Jersey
Politicians from Norwich, Connecticut
1801 births
1869 deaths
Whig Party members of the United States House of Representatives from New York (state)
Burials in New York (state)
19th-century American politicians
Politicians from Ithaca, New York